Norman Wood (born 10 August 1932) was an English professional footballer who played as a wing half for Sunderland.

References

1932 births
Living people
Footballers from Sunderland
English footballers
Association football wing halves
Silksworth Juniors F.C. players
Sunderland A.F.C. players
English Football League players